Intro is an American R&B trio from Brooklyn, New York City, New York. The trio consisted of members Jeff Sanders, Clinton "Buddy" Wike and lead singer/songwriter Kenny Greene. The group was discovered by rapper Heavy D, who then introduced the group to DJ Eddie F. Eddie F signed the group to Untouchables management. Intro released two albums (for Atlantic Records): 1993's Intro and their second album, 1995's New Life. The group had a string of US hits in the 1990s. The hits included the singles "Love Thang", "Let Me Be the One", the Stevie Wonder cover "Ribbon in the Sky", "Funny How Time Flies" and their highest charting hit, "Come Inside". Greene died in 2001.

Discography

Albums

Singles

References

External links
 

African-American musical groups
Atlantic Records artists
American contemporary R&B musical groups
American soul musical groups
Musical groups from Brooklyn